Jon Manfrellotti (born 1953) is an American actor who has appeared in several sitcoms.  He is perhaps best known for his role as Gianni in Everybody Loves Raymond.

Career 
Manfrellotti got his first role in Flodder in Amerika! in 1992. Since then, he has made several minor appearances in several mainstream shows. These include Law & Order, Seinfeld, Platypus Man, NYPD Blue and Mad Men. He has also appeared in several films including Grilled, Just My Luck, Welcome to Mooseport, Crime of the Century and Spy Hard.

His first major role was as Ray Barone's friend "Gianni" for 25 episodes on Everybody Loves Raymond and Doug Heffernan's friend "Gianni" in two episodes of The King of Queens.

Before he got that steady role on Everybody Loves Raymond, he made his first appearance during the show's first season as the Cable Guy on the episode “The Game”.

Manfrellotti appeared in a recurring role on the comedy-drama Men of a Certain Age during its two-season run on TNT.

Filmography

Film

Television

References

External links 

American male film actors
American male television actors
American people of Italian descent
Living people
1953 births